Sintrivani/Ekthesi (literally Fountain/Exposition) is an under-construction metro station serving Thessaloniki Metro's Line 1 and Line 2. It is expected to enter service in 2023 The station is named after an Ottoman fountain, which marked the eastern entrance into the walled city before its expansion, and the Thessaloniki International Fair, whose grounds are immediately adjacent.

The station also appears in the 1988 Thessaloniki Metro proposal. In previous iterations of the Thessaloniki Metro Development Plan, the station is shown with the alternative spelling Syntrivani.

References

See also
List of Thessaloniki Metro stations

Thessaloniki Metro